WSGW-FM (100.5 MHz), branded FM Talk & Sports 100.5, is a radio station broadcasting a news, talk, and sports format to the Greater Tri-Cities area of Michigan, United States. Licensed to Carrollton, Michigan, it first began broadcasting in 1989 under the WCWK call sign. It is sister station of, and shares some local programming with, WSGW-AM 790. The station is owned by Alpha Media, through licensee Alpha Media Licensee LLC.

Programming

News/Talk
WSGW-FM features a local morning news program, national news shows America in The Morning and Our American Stories with Lee Habeeb; hourly updates from CBS News Radio; conservative talk programming such as The Sean Hannity Show and the Glenn Beck Program;  and the overnight paranormal activity/conspiracy theory talk show Coast to Coast AM.

Sports
Local sports programming includes Michigan Wolverines football and men's basketball, the Ontario Hockey League's Saginaw Spirit and Saginaw Valley State Cardinals college football.

History
The station was originally adult contemporary-formatted and then adopted a long-running and successful CHR format, known as 100.5 "The Fox". WTCF was owned by Mid America Broadcasting through most of the 1990s. WTCF enjoyed a large ratings margin on WIOG (which shifted to a Hot AC sound around the same time) in the 18-34 demographic. The station was live and featured "Steve and Stacie in the morning", "Steve Williams & Amy Wilde morning show", Rick and Jean Marie in the morning and later McGill in The Morning. Other talent included Mike Cruise in the Afternoon, and Greg Fry at night who always started the Tri-Cities out right on the weekend using the Iggy Pop classic "Wild Child."  News veteran/radio personality Lisa Ferrel was the co-host prior to the flip to Pirate Radio. Other Morning shows included, Leeroy the love toy, Rick Dees, Josh & Holly, and Lisa & Dylan in the morning.

In 1998, WTCF was sold to Liggett Broadcasting, owner of WHNN. 1999, the station adopted the name "Pirate Radio" and shifted its format from Mainstream to Rhythmic Contemporary. Though the station's ratings remained high during the "Pirate Radio" stage, owner Wilks Broadcasting soon shifted the station to Hot AC under the moniker "Mix 100," which proved disastrous, as the station's ratings plummeted. Rival station WIOG, which had been a Hot AC for most of the '90s, took advantage of this by returning to CHR and regained some of the ratings ground it had lost to WTCF (though its ratings have never returned to the double-digit shares the station enjoyed in the late 1980s).

After a return to an Adult CHR format and the "Fox" moniker failed to raise ratings at 100.5, new owners NextMedia Group pulled the plug on "The Fox" for good in 2004 and changed the format to Rhythmic Oldies as "Kool 100.5," WXQL. Ratings remained low, and a year and a half later, the station became "The Beat," WTBT, with a dance format heavy on dance remixes of CHR/pop hits. The "Beat" format lasted only a few months before the station became WSGW-FM, airing a talk format with some programming separate from its AM sister. On August 29, 2007, the call sign was changed to WTKQ-FM and was then changed back to WSGW-FM on January 15, 2009.

NextMedia sold WSGW-FM and their 32 other radio stations to Digity, LLC for $85 million; the transaction was consummated on February 10, 2014. Effective February 25, 2016, Digity, LLC and its 124 radio stations were acquired by Alpha Media for $264 million.

References

Michiguide.com - WSGW History

External links

SGW-FM
News and talk radio stations in the United States
Radio stations established in 1989
Alpha Media radio stations